Adom FM is a privately owned radio station in Accra, the capital of Ghana.
The station is owned and run by the media group company Multimedia Group Limited. The word Adom in the Twi dialect means grace.

Adom FM organizes the annual gospel music concert Adom Praiz.

References

External links
 Listen Online on TuneIn
 Listen Online on Live Online Radio

Radio stations in Ghana
Greater Accra Region
Mass media in Accra